A referendum on citizenship was held in Liechtenstein on 7 December 1986. Voters were asked whether they approved of a proposal on acquiring and losing citizenship. It was approved by 52.0% of voters.

Results

References

1986 referendums
1986 in Liechtenstein
1986
December 1986 events in Europe